Joseph Murphy (born October 4, 1996), professionally known as Celestaphone, is an American music producer from Southern California.

Early life
Celestaphone was born in Riverside, California. The name originates from the zither instrument, the Celestaphone.

Music career
Celestaphone released his first solo EP, Glorifying, in October 2014. His first collaborative effort was producing Dionté BOOM's single Fish Market. The song was included in a 2015 edition of the Arkansas Times's Rock Candy journal.

Menu (01-30) and Trust (31–60) mixtapes followed. In 2016, Murphy published a second EP entitled Minappi's Last Wondrous Escapade, and in 2017 released three full-length albums: Robosoul, To Cite Psych, and To Cite Fright. The EP, along with album To Cite Fright received a nod from Raoul Rego, former webmaster at WREK, in an interview with the station published by Bandcamp Daily. Portrait of a Harlot was released on March 3, 2018.

His first vocal album, Tying Up Loose Friends, was released on July 30, 2018.

Discography

Solo
 Weevil in Disguise (2020)
 Tying Up Loose Friends (2018)
 Portrait of a Harlot (2018)
 To Cite Fright (2017)
 To Cite Psych (2017)
 Robosoul (2017)
 Minappi's Last Wondrous Escapade (2016)
 Trust (31–60) (2015)
 Menu (01-30) (2015)
 Glorifying (2014)

Collaborative albums 
 A Year of Octobers (2021)

Production discography

References

External links

 
 
 

1996 births
Living people
American hip hop record producers
Record producers from California
American hip hop DJs
West Coast hip hop musicians